Italy at the Athletics European Cup (from 2009 replade by European Team Championships. from 2013 known as European Athletics Team Championships) has participated at all editions from 1965 European Cup (first men's final, from third edition, in 1970 European Cup).

Participations
Update to 2017 European Team Championships

Details finals

European Team Championships event podium

Medals
Update to 2017 European Team Championships

By event

Men

Women

Men's details

Track events

Field events

Relay events

Women's details
European Team Championships

See also
 Italy national athletics team
 Italy at the European Athletics Team Championships
 Italy at the Athletics World Cup

References

External links 
 European Cup A Final and Super League (Men) (from 1965 to 2006)
 European Cup A Final and Super League (Women) (from 1965 to 2006)

European Cup
Nations at the European Athletics Team Championships